The Golden Cavalry of St George was the colloquial name of subsidies paid out by the British government to other states in Europe in the 18th and the 19th centuries, particularly during the Napoleonic Wars. The name is a euphemism and derives from the British sovereign gold coins often used in those payments, which bore an image of Saint George, the patron saint of England, on horseback slaying the dragon.

During the War of the Austrian Succession, Britain kept Austria afloat by large subsidies owing to the Anglo-Austrian Alliance. In the Seven Years' War, Britain did the same for Prussia, which was now allied against the Austrians. The Anglo-Prussian Convention, signed in April 1758, guaranteed Prussia a payment of £670,000 a year.

In more recent times T. E. Lawrence (Lawrence of Arabia) is reported to have made payments of gold sovereigns to Arab soldiers during the Arab Revolt in return for their co-operation, and he was nicknamed in Arabic Abu Khayyal, meaning "father of the horsemen".

During World War II, the Cavalry of St George was a euphemism for large-scale bribery of Spanish officials in Francisco Franco's dictatorship to prevent Spain from joining the Germans in the war.

Napoleonic Wars
During the Napoleonic Wars, a number of states in Europe were allied with the British against France. Britain, which had a large navy but a small army, was unable to deploy major forces on the Continent. Britain was a wealthy commercial power and so paid out millions of pounds to Allied nations, which could field much larger armies against the French. An example is the £1,500,000 paid to Austria to commit troops to the campaign against France in the Netherlands in 1793, an expedition to which the British could contribute only men. Adjusted for inflation, this is equivalent to £273,000,000 in 2011.

Large sums were made available for the purpose, sometimes as formal subsidies and sometimes as bribes for European statesman. It was partly funded by the introduction of the income tax by Prime Minister William Pitt the Younger. The policy was extremely costly but ultimately proved successful, as a coalition of European nations eventually defeated France in 1814.

References

Sources
 Esdaile, Charles. The Peninsular War. Penguin Books (2003)
 Hague, William. William Pitt The Young. Perennial (2005)
 Harvey, Robert. The War of Wars: The Great European Conflict, 1793-1815. Robinson (2007)

Napoleonic Wars
Diplomacy